During the 1917–18 season Hearts competed in the Scottish First Division and the East of Scotland Shield.

Fixtures

Dunedin Cup

Wilson Cup

Rosebery Charity Cup

Scottish Football League

See also
List of Heart of Midlothian F.C. seasons

References

Statistical Record 17-18

External links
Official Club website

Heart of Midlothian F.C. seasons
Heart of Midlothian